Peter Cornelius (born 29 January 1951 in Vienna, Austria) is an Austrian pop-singer, guitarist and a former member of Enigma.

Discography

Albums 
 1974 Hampelmann
 1974 Fleckerlteppich
 1976 Eine Rose aus Papier
 1980 Der Kaffee ist fertig
 1980 Zwei
 1981 Reif für die Insel
 1982 Bevor i geh' / Ohne Filter
 1983 Fata Morgana
 1984 Süchtig
 1986 Gegen den Strom
 1987 CORNELIUS '87
 1988 Sensibel
 1989 Jahreszeiten
 1989 Live aus dem Wiener Konzerthaus
 1990 In Bewegung
 1992 Cornelius + Cretu
 1993 Lieber heut als morgen
 2001 Lebenszeichen
 2003 Schatten und Licht
 2006 Wie ein Junger Hund im hohen Gras
 2008 Handschrift
 2012 12 neue 12
 2017 Unverwüstlich

DVDs 
 December 2006: Peter Cornelius: Live vor 100.000 auf dem Donauinselfest

Compilations 
 1984 Streicheleinheiten
 1987 Meine grossen Erfolge
 1988 Liederbuch
 1988 Portrait
 1989 Poptakes
 1989 Instrumental
 1990 Sehnsucht
 1992 Streicheleinheiten
 1995 Meisterstücke
 1995 Song Portrait
 1996 Liedermacher
 1997 Die grössten Hits aus 25 Jahren
 1998 Master Series
 1999 Schwerelos (box set)
 2001 Best of Peter Cornelius
 2004 Peter Cornelius - Das Beste
 2006 Peter Cornelius - Best of - Reif für die Insel (disc 1 of 3)
 2015 Peter Cornelius - Best of - 36 grosse Songs

External links 
 
Peter Cornelius 

1951 births
Living people
Austrian guitarists
Austrian expatriates in Germany
Musicians from Vienna
Enigma (German band) members